Coffin Bay is a town and locality in South Australia.

Coffin Bay may also refer to.

Coffin Bay mallee, a common name for Eucalyptus albopurpurea
Coffin Bay National Park, a protected area in South Australia
Coffin Bay pony, a  variety of feral horse found in South Australia
Coffin Bay Peninsula, a peninsula in South Australia
Coffin Bay Tramway, former railway line in South Australia

See also
Coffin (disambiguation)